Tipton is a rural locality in the Toowoomba Region, Queensland, Australia. In the  Tipton had a population of 39 people.

History 
The locality was named after a small village in England.

Tipton Provisional School opened on 4 August 1884. On 1 January 1909 it became Tipton State School. It closed on 31 October 1911. It reopened on 1 April 1929 and closed on 19 September 1948.

In the  Tipton had a population of 39 people.

Road infrastructure
Dalby–Cecil Plains Road runs through from north to west.

References 

Toowoomba Region
Localities in Queensland